Musqan (also Romanized as Mūsqān and Mowseqān; also known as Mosqān and Musghān) is a village in Kuh Mareh Sorkhi Rural District, Arzhan District, Shiraz County, Fars Province, Iran. At the 2006 census, its population was 897, in 186 families.

References 

Populated places in Shiraz County